Paul Andrew Stalteri (born October 18, 1977) is a Canadian former professional soccer player who played as a defender or midfielder. He spent most of his professional career in Germany, winning the league and cup double with Werder Bremen in the 2003–04 season. Stalteri also played football in the Premier League for Tottenham Hotspur and Fulham.

A regular for the Canada national team, Stalteri made a national record 84 appearances at the senior level, scoring 7 goals. He was part of the squad that won the CONCACAF Gold Cup in 2000.

He currently serves as an assistant coach for Toronto FC.

Early life 
Stalteri was born to an Italian father and a Guyanese mother. While growing up, Stalteri says his favourite player was Paolo Maldini and the first live football match he ever saw was Toronto Blizzard. He also considered Physical Education to be his favourite subject.

While playing youth soccer in Ontario with the Malton Bullets, won a Robbie International Soccer Tournament Championship.

Club career 
A defender who can play either side of the field as well as in midfield, Stalteri began his soccer career playing one year of college soccer at Clemson University in 1996. Following his first year, he elected to turn professional, signing a contract with the Toronto Lynx while attending York University. After playing one season with the Lynx, alongside fellow Canada national team teammate Dwayne De Rosario, where he led the team in scoring with eight goals and two assists, Stalteri was noticed by a scout from Werder Bremen and purchased from the team. After two and a half seasons in the reserves, Stalteri made his debut with the club in August 2000, scoring in the first game of the season against Energie Cottbus.

During the 2001–02 season, Stalteri established his role in the first team at Bremen and went on to cement his role as a regular in the 2002–03 season. In 2003–04, Werder Bremen won the Bundesliga.

In May 2005, Stalteri transferred to English Premiership club Tottenham Hotspur. He featured heavily in the 2005–06 campaign as Spurs narrowly missed out on a Champions League place, but the arrival of full back Pascal Chimbonda at White Hart Lane the following season limited his chances.

On March 4, 2007, after coming on as a substitute, he scored a dramatic last minute winner against London rivals West Ham United to complete an extraordinary 4–3 win. He had hardly featured in the first team all season up to that point. His other Spurs goals came against Manchester City in the league and Leicester City in the FA Cup.

On January 31, 2008, Stalteri moved to Fulham on loan until the end of the season. He made his debut for Fulham away at Middlesbrough on February 9, 2008 where his team lost 1–0. Having returned to White Hart Lane, his contract was terminated by mutual consent on December 21, 2008.

Stalteri returned to the Bundesliga, having been immediately signed by Borussia Mönchengladbach where he joined fellow international Rob Friend.

He announced his retirement as a player at the age of 35 on March 20, 2013.

International career 
Stalteri was a regular starter for the Canada national team for over ten years from making his debut on August 17, 1997 against Iran. In total, he won 84 caps and scored seven goals for the national team. That made him the most capped Canadian of all time until this record was surpassed by Julian De Guzman in 2015. He was named team captain for a friendly on June 1, 2007 against Venezuela, and remained captain for international fixtures for the rest of his international career including for the entirety of the 2007 CONCACAF Gold Cup. On September 7, 2010 Stalteri earned his 83rd cap for Canada in a 2–1 win over Honduras making him the all-time leader in appearances for the Canada men's national team.

In May 2017, Stalteri was inducted into the Canadian Soccer Hall of Fame.

Career statistics

Club

International goals 
Scores and results list Canada's goal tally first, score column indicates score after each Stalteri goal.

Honours

Werder Bremen
Bundesliga: 2003–04
DFB-Pokal: 1998–99, 2003–04
DFL-Ligapokal: 2006
DFB-Hallenpokal runner-up: 2001

Tottenham Hotspur
English League Cup: 2007–08

Canada
 CONCACAF Gold Cup All-Tournament team (Honorable Mention): 2007

References

External links 
 
 
 
 / Canada Soccer Hall of Fame
 
 
 
 Paul Stalteri profile, detailed club and national team statistics, honours (palmares) and timeline

1977 births
Living people
Soccer players from Toronto
Sportspeople from Etobicoke
Association football defenders
Association football utility players
Canadian soccer players
Canada men's international soccer players
Canada men's youth international soccer players
Canada men's under-23 international soccer players
Canadian people of Calabrian descent
Canadian sportspeople of Guyanese descent
2000 CONCACAF Gold Cup players
2001 FIFA Confederations Cup players
CONCACAF Gold Cup-winning players
2002 CONCACAF Gold Cup players
2003 CONCACAF Gold Cup players
2007 CONCACAF Gold Cup players
2009 CONCACAF Gold Cup players
A-League (1995–2004) players
Premier League players
Bundesliga players
Clemson Tigers men's soccer players
Toronto Lynx players
SV Werder Bremen players
SV Werder Bremen II players
Tottenham Hotspur F.C. players
Fulham F.C. players
Borussia Mönchengladbach players
York University alumni
Canadian expatriate soccer players
Canadian expatriate sportspeople in the United States
Expatriate soccer players in the United States
Canadian expatriate sportspeople in Germany
Expatriate footballers in Germany
Canadian expatriate sportspeople in England
Expatriate footballers in England
York United FC non-playing staff
Toronto FC non-playing staff